Gymnasium Bayreuther Straße is a school in Wuppertal, Germany. It was founded in 1907.

History 

The school was founded in 1907 called Königliches Realgymnasium i.E. zu Elberfeld. It was renamed to Staatliches Reformrealgymnasium in 1918, to Hindenburg Realgymnasium in 1927, to  Hindenburg-Schule Staatliche Oberschule für Jungen in 1937, to Staatliches Naturwissenschaftliches Gymnasium Wuppertal-Elberfeld in 1947 and finally it was renamed in 1974 to the current name.

Integrative class 

Since 2007 eight students from a special school and sixteen students from the Gymnasium Bayreuther Straße are learning in an integrative class.

Schools in North Rhine-Westphalia
Buildings and structures in Wuppertal
Educational institutions established in 1907
1907 establishments in Germany